These are the Marine Communications and Traffic Services centres operated by the Canadian Coast Guard. They provide distress and safety communications, vessel traffic services and marine weather information. "The Canadian Coast Guard announced in May of 2012 that they would be reducing the number of MCTS Centres across Canada from 22 to the present 12 centres in an effort to reduce the Coast Guard operating budget."

See also
 Equipment of the Canadian Coast Guard
 List of Canadian Coast Guard Bases and Stations

External links

References

.
Coast Guard MCTS Centres